Duoth Koang Rueh Wour is a South Sudanese politician, belonging to the United Democratic Front. He was elected to the Jonglei State Legislative Assembly in 2010 as a UDF party list candidate (the sole non-SPLM party list candidate elected).

Bibliography
Ruea , Duoth Koang, Chol, Gatwech Peter Kulang. Bok Cäätni Kolang Toat ; Nuer ( Kolang ) Folk Stories : Part One . ( Reader for Advanced Pupils ). Nairobi: Institute of Regional Languages - SIL Sudan , 2001

References

Living people
Year of birth missing (living people)
United Democratic Front (South Sudan) politicians